Nathan Matthew Cooper  (born 1980) is a Canadian politician who was elected in the 2015 and 2019 Alberta general elections to represent the electoral district of Olds-Didsbury-Three Hills in the 29th and 30th Alberta Legislatures. Cooper was a municipal councillor in Carstairs, Alberta prior to being elected to the Legislative Assembly. Cooper also served as Chief of Staff to the Wildrose Official Opposition caucus.

On July 24, 2017, Cooper was elected interim leader of the new United Conservative Party caucus, becoming the Leader of the Opposition in that process. On that same date, he and his interim leadership team nominally assumed the leaderships of the two parties that merged to form the UCP, the Progressive Conservatives and Wildrose. At the time, Alberta electoral law did not allow parties to formally merge. On 28 October 2017, Cooper's tenure as interim leader ended when former PC leader Jason Kenney was elected as the UCP's first full-time leader.

Cooper was elected to serve as the Speaker of the Legislative Assembly of Alberta on May 21, 2019.

Speaker of the House
Cooper was elected Speaker of the House in the Alberta Legislature on May 21, 2019.

COVID-19 letter controversy 
In 2021, Cooper signed a letter opposing restrictions amid the COVID-19 pandemic.

Cooper was widely criticized for violating the Speaker's role of impartiality and impeding his ability to moderate debate. Former Speaker David Carter has suggested that Cooper should resign or be removed by a motion of non-confidence.

He later apologized for violating the Speaker's traditional role of impartiality. Former Speaker Robert Wanner stated that he believed the apology did not go far enough.

Electoral history

2019 general election

2015 general election

References

Wildrose Party MLAs
Living people
1980 births
Alberta municipal councillors
People from Carstairs, Alberta
21st-century Canadian politicians
Leaders of the United Conservative Party
United Conservative Party MLAs